There were eight major Public holidays in the Soviet Union. There were over 30 holidays total.

Major holidays

See also
Public holidays in Russia

 
Soviet Union